NoFap is a website and community forum that serves as a support group for those who wish to give up pornography and masturbation. Its name comes from the slang term fap, referring to male masturbation. While reasons for this abstinence vary by individual, the main motivation cited is attempting to overcome addiction to pornography, or other compulsive sexual behaviours. Other reasons  for abstinence include religious and moral reasons, self-improvement, and physical beliefs that are not supported by medicine.

The group's views and efforts to combat pornography addiction have been criticized as simplistic, outdated, and incorrect by neuroscientists, psychologists, and other medical professionals. The purported science behind the group's activities said to come from anti-porn activist Gary Wilson, "an Oregon man with no scientific training or background, who has made a career peddling pseudoscience."

As of September 16, 2022, the NoFap online community has more than 333,000 registered members.

Founding

NoFap was founded in June 2011 by Pittsburgh web developer Alexander Rhodes after reading a thread on Reddit about a 2003 Chinese study, which claimed that men who refrain from masturbation for seven days experience a 145.7% spike in testosterone levels on the seventh day. This hit the front page of a popular forum on Reddit. The website states that some NoFap participants aim to "improve their interpersonal relationships", do a "challenge of willpower – to seize control of your sexuality and turn it into superpowers", but always with the goal of being able to "abstain from PMO (porn/masturbation/orgasm)." The expression fap is an onomatopoeic Internet slang term for male masturbation that first appeared in the 1999 web comic Sexy Losers to indicate the sound of a male character masturbating.

While the website is most commonly associated with men seeking to quit porn and reduce masturbation, there are a minority of females who are users of the website as well, who are nicknamed "Femstronauts"; Alexander Rhodes has estimated that five percent of participants are women. Rhodes appears in the documentary written and directed by Nicholas Tana called Sticky: A (Self) Love Story, in which he discusses his findings and his opinions about masturbation. After this, Rhodes created NoFap as a subreddit forum community on Reddit. The endeavour is sometimes referred to as "fapstinence".

NoFap.com
Users on NoFap's subreddit more than tripled in number in two years, leading Rhodes to build an off-Reddit forum at NoFap.com and begin other plans to better serve the website's fast-growing factions in Brazil, Germany, and China. NoFap.com is a forum-style website where individuals who have committed to abstain from pornography and/or masturbation for a period of time can talk about their experiences and engage in challenges to help them recover. NoFap.com is the sister website of the Reddit-hosted NoFap community.

Membership

Demographics
A 2014 internet survey found that 99% of NoFap followers are male, although women are also a part of NoFap.  The membership of NoFap ranges from atheists, like founder Rhodes, to fundamentalist Christians. However, Rhodes has publicly solicited and received funding from religious groups.  The users of the website call themselves "Fapstronauts." Some correspondents have nicknamed NoFap's community members as "NoFappers", "fapstinent", or "no-fappers". Some self-described porn addicts seek out NoFap for help, while others join the website for the challenge or to improve their lives and interpersonal relationships.

Beliefs
The overwhelming goal of members of the NoFap forums is to stop masturbation entirely, and that this goal is due to their "perception of masturbation as unhealthy". After abstaining from porn and masturbation for a period of time, some of NoFap's users claim to experience various improvements in physical and mental health. Some NoFap users say their brains were warped by porn, at the expense of real relationships.

NoFap hosts a wide variety of different opinions on sexual health, and supports users with various goals as long as they are trying to improve their sexual health.

Some of the group's beliefs cite the work of Gary Wilson, an anti-pornography activist who has no medical or scientific training. Wilson's work is pseudoscientific.

Political and religious motivation
According to various sources, the overwhelming majority of all websites and YouTube channels devoted to anti-masturbation and anti-porn addiction propaganda, channels, and websites supporting NoFap are owned by far-right, religious fundamentalists, and conservative who are biblical inerrantists, and also are entirely political in nature.  The NoFap community is sometimes viewed to be a part of the manosphereonline groups credited with propagating misogyny.

Psychologists, MDs, and social scientists noticed that the traditional Christian obsession with combating sexual activities, including masturbation, is unhealthy and unwholesome, and this also applies to secular advocacy of anti-pornography and anti-masturbation, including 16 US states' legislatures which have declared that pornography is a "public health crisis".

The American Psychiatric Association had by then already dismissed such moral panic ("political stunt") in DSM-5 (published in 2013), and DSM-5-TR, published in March 2022, does not recognize a diagnosis of sexual addiction (which would include internet pornography viewing). Neither ICD-10, nor ICD-11 recognize sex addiction or porn addiction as a valid diagnosis.

Reception

Therapist Paula Hall for The Huffington Post was asked about NoFap claims of "physical health benefits mentioned including renewed energy, greater focus, concentration, and better sleep" and responded "there is little medical evidence for any of these changes". Therapist Robert Weiss for The Huffington Post sees NoFap as part of a tech backlash. The endeavor has also been criticized as generating embarrassing side effects such as prolonged or unwanted erections in men or an excessive libido. Psychologist David J. Ley wrote: "I'm not in opposition to them, but I do think their ideas are simplistic, naive and promote a sad, reductionistic and distorted view of male sexuality and masculinity". Ley criticizes NoFap supporters as amateurs who are using "bad data" and "extrapolations on weak science to argue that porn has a disproportionate effect on the brain" and claim that porn use causes erectile dysfunction. Ley has stated that the website is a continuation of the anti-masturbation movements from the past, such as Swiss doctor Samuel Tissot's 18th-century claims that masturbation was an illness that "weakened the male spirit" and led to immorality; American doctor Benjamin Rush, who claimed that masturbation caused blindness; and W.K. Kellogg, who developed corn flakes as part of his anti-masturbation efforts.

Research concerning NoFap forums and followers
NoFap appears to oppose science. Their website includes legal warnings that scientists are prohibited from conducting research on them, and they have threatened to sue scientists who do.
 
A 2021 qualitative study found that NoFap's approach to pornography appears to be harmful. Specifically, the scientists studied "members of the online NoFap/PornFree self-help communities" and concluded "commitment to abstinence, framed by the notions of recovery and relapse, was found to be a major factor for maintaining distress" Another 2021 study concluded with a warning "...the mythical articulations that emerge from contestations over concepts like NoFap have the potential to galvanize young men into horrific, real-world violence." This later study viewed NoFap as creating self-pitying, self-constructed victims that "galvanizes misogyny and racism".

A 2020 study found that while NoFap claimed to be science-based, the more that NoFap followers believed that they should abstain from masturbation, the more they also reported "lower trust in science". Social psychologists Taylor and Jackson, who analyzed the content of NoFap forums, concluded in their study that some NoFap participants not only rejected pornography, but also radical feminist critiques of pornography. They also stated that members of NoFap frequently utilized and redeployed familiar hegemonic masculine views (e.g. men as dominant seekers of pleasure and women as the 'natural' suppliers of this pleasure), in turn reproducing societal expectations of gendered sexual dominance and submission. Another 2020 study stated that the forum represents itself as a source of medical information, which seems to discourage members from seeking actual medical advice and instead self-diagnosing.

A 2020 study analysing discourse on pornography, published in the journal Social Forces, stated regarding NoFap: "These claims do not necessarily come from scientific experts. Instead, we find that newspaper articles draw from a variety of professionals who are not scientists" and that "Rhodes is quoted repeatedly reflecting that he was 'addicted to internet porn' and shares the personal consequences." They conclude "journalists and political actors are overextending scientific findings to advance their media markets and political agendas" in support of gender and sexual norms.

A 2020 paper stated that NoFap appears to have been specifically targeted by far-right groups, writing, "the struggle for the 'remasculinization' of white men by overcoming porn (addiction) had to be an antisemitic one: a fight against 'Jewish pornography' and 'Jewish filth,' in which other current anti-porn actors such as NoFap should join". Cultural studies scholar Simon Strick stated regarding NoFap that a "racist culture war...was already implied in the call to join the ‘movement’ by becoming abstinent". The chapter continues, "NoFap present themselves as a search for non-toxic and progressive gender roles, even as they partake in gendered and racialized narratives that are no less violent".

NoFap supporters are "known for vitriolically attacking female scholars not sharing their view". Sociologist Kelsy Burke stated that "Rhodes and a small staff manage NoFap.com and its brand full time". She states, "There is no scientific evidence that supports the idea of these superpowers. Yet hundreds of thousands of NoFap users insist they experience them." She critiques similar gender problems in groups including NoFap, stating, "The scientific and spiritual gets muddled together as participants reinforce damaging gender stereotypes—those of hypersexual, biologically ravenous men who are simply "wired differently" than women. Women whose sexuality exists only in relation to male desire...porn addiction recovery reproduces the worst lessons of porn itself." NoFap forums are described by a 2020 paper as a place where "men's sexual entitlement to women was left unquestioned".

Claims of the semen retention community as well as those of the NoFap community are among the least accurate in respect to men's health.

The medical orthodoxy attributes the sufferance of NoFap users to various mental disorders, rather than caused by PMO (porn, masturbation, orgasm). Prause and Binnie note that the NoFap forums are overloaded with conspiracy theories seeking to explain this away.

Journalistic descriptions of NoFap
Several journalists have criticized NoFap. Some of them report that the forums were filled with misogyny, stating that "there is a darker side to NoFap. Among the reams of Reddit discussions and YouTube videos, a fundamentally misogynistic rhetoric regularly emerges", and that "the NoFap community has become linked to wider sexism and misogyny, reducing women to sexual objects to be attained or abstained from and shaming sexually active women." NoFap followers have posted videos on YouTube that regularly feature anti-homosexual and anti-woman values, such as 'stop being a little bitch' demands. A New York Times story by Rob Kuznia expressed concern about white supremacists promoting the belief that pornography is a conspiracy of Judaism. Scientist Shane Kraus, PhD, speaking to CNET describes there is "no scholarship" supporting the Reboot claims of NoFap.

According to a 2021 opinion article in The Daily Dot, "The NoFap model is nothing more than a breeding ground for racism, misogyny, and whorephobic violence. It’s time we take it seriously and close up its pipeline into violent behavior once and for all." The article linked NoFap's ideology to recent murders.

Der Spiegel reported that some NoFap adherents also belong to groups with members who have been connected to hate crimes and terrorist murders, arguing that there is a general potential for radicalization within the manosphere.

Litigation
NoFap has been involved in legal actions filed or threatened by its founder, Alexander Rhodes. After threatening two scientists with litigation, the scientists published a letter defending the need to be allowed to criticize NoFap: "As [NoFap] operate in the public sphere, however, we deem it not only as legitimate but necessary to acknowledge and cite them as one prominent voice in the debate around masturbation abstinence—everything else would be an unjustifiable muting of their stand." For publishing a critique of NoFap's fundraising efforts, Rhodes sued ScramNews in the UK. ScramNews apologized to Alexander Rhodes and agreed to pay substantial damages and legal fees after false allegations and defamation. NoFap threatened to sue The Spectator for writing about their association with right-wing, antisemitic groups. They threatened to sue a blogger for using 'NoFap' as a trademark. 

Rhodes' aggressive litigation has had a chilling effect on free speech, as "Sex educators, adult industry groups and therapists told Motherboard that they are scared of legal action from NoFap, and some of them weren't willing to speak openly about masturbation and the stigma of watching porn."

Similar sites
In 2017, an Independent article called "Inside the Community of Men Who Have Given Up Porn" noted that an alternative subreddit, /r/pornfree, is different from 'NoFap' as members abstain from pornography but not necessarily masturbation. Another Independent article, from 2018, described /r/pornfree as less 'extreme' compared to /r/nofap.

A study of NoFap reddit users found that NoFap members were most likely to also be members of TheRedPill, seduction, and similar men's rights and pick up artist Reddit groups. Another study reported a similar pattern that NoFap Reddit members also were likely to be supporters of U.S. President Donald Trump.

See also
 Controversial Reddit communities
 Effects of pornography
 Men Going Their Own Way
 No Nut November
 Opposition to pornography
 Postorgasmic illness syndrome
 Semen retention
 Sex Addicts Anonymous
 Sex and Love Addicts Anonymous
 Sexaholics Anonymous
 Sexual abstinence

Explanatory notes

References

External links
 
 NoFap Benefits: Real or Overhyped? at healthline.com

Addiction and substance abuse organizations
Anti-pornography movements
Human sexuality organizations
Internet properties established in 2011
Opposition to masturbation
Organizations established in 2011
Pseudoscience
Radicalization
Subreddits
Sexual abstinence
Sexual addiction
Sexuality and computing
Support groups